John Candler (10 April 1787, Great Bardfield – 4 July 1869) was an English abolitionist active in Chelmsford, Essex.

John was the son of Elizabeth and William Candler. His father was a schoolmaster, and around 1799 he resigned his school and moved to Ipswich. Here John was apprenticed to a Quaker draper. Although his formal education drew to a close, John learnt Hebrew and Greek to better understand the Christian scriptures. This reflected the deeply religious viewpoint which his parents had passed unto him.

When John had gained enough experience, he moved to Chelmsford where he set up in business as a draper with a partner from that town. The business was successful, and he soon married Maria Knight of Chelmsford. Maria was engaged in charitable works, and when John had accumulated enough money to provide a comfortable income, the couple dedicated their lives to various reform movements such as temperance and the abolition of slavery.

In 1839 the couple set out on a tour of the Caribbean. He visited more than a dozen islands, including Jamaica, Barbados, Martinique, Tortola, Saint Thomas and Puerto Rico. He sent optimistic reports to his friend Thomas Clarkson regarding the prospects of the recently liberated former slaves.  They then started a three-month stay in Haiti on 1 January 1841. He met with President Jean-Pierre Boyer, who enquired after Thomas Clarkson. In April he went on to the United States of America and Canada, returning to England in September of that year. He was then successfully proposed by Joseph Cooper to become a corresponding member of the British Anti-Slavery Society.

He was then appointed Superintendent to The Retreat, a Quaker facility for therapeutic treatment for mental distress. He remained here until 1846, when following the passing of the Lunacy Act 1845 he was replaced with a medically qualified doctor, John Thurnam.

Works
 West Indies. Extracts from the journal of John Candler, whilst travelling in Jamaica. London: Harvey and Darton, 1841

References

1787 births
1869 deaths
19th-century Quakers
English abolitionists
English Quakers
English temperance activists
People from Chelmsford
Quaker abolitionists